The Jinde Bridge is a bridge connecting Donggang Township and Xinyuan Township in Pingtung County, Taiwan.

History
The bridge was opened for traffic in October 2002. On 27 April 2014, the Pingtung County Government organized the bridge lighting ceremony for the bridge.

Technical specification
The bridge crosses the Donggang River for a length of 440 meters and a width of 21.3 meters. Its main span spans over 155 meters and it has a 30-meter high arch.

See also
 
 
 
 List of bridges in Taiwan

References

2002 establishments in Taiwan
Bridges completed in 2002
Bridges in Pingtung County